Pavel Medvedev may refer to:

Pavel Medvedev (ice hockey, born 1989), Russian ice hockey player
Pavel Medvedev (ice hockey, born 1992), Russian ice hockey player
Pavel Spiridonovich Medvedev (1888–1919), Russian Bolshevik and executioner
Pavel Medvedev (scholar) (1892–1938), Russian literary scholar